Dancing with the Stars Myanmar is a Burmese dance competition television series that premiered on October 27, 2019, on MRTV-4. It was based on the format of the British TV series Strictly Come Dancing. The show is hosted by Kaung Htet Zaw, alongside La Won Htet.

The format of the show consists of a celebrity paired with a professional dancer. Each couple performs predetermined dances and competes against the others for judges' points and audience votes. The couple receiving the lowest combined total of judges' points and audience votes is eliminated each week until only the champion dance pair remains.

Cast

Presenters
Key:
 Current presenter 
 Previous presenter

Judging panel

Key:
 Current judging panel
 Previous judge(s)

Contestants

Season 1

Myo Ko Ko San (with her professional partner Hi)
May Kabyar (with her professional partner Dake Dake)
Aung Khant Hmue (with his professional partner Nay Che)
Jean-Marc (with his professional partner Alfiya)
Tay Zar Kyaw (with his professional partner Eloisa)
Olivier Cotton (with his professional partner Yoe Yo)
Lucas (with his professional partner Florence)
Hsu Eaint San (with her professional partner Lynn Htet)
Thazin Nwe Win (with her professional partner Zek)
Han Thi (with her professional partner Zuko)
Paul Austin (with his professional partner May Thell)
Nant Chit Nadi Zaw (with her professional partner Tae Min)

Series overview

References

External links

Burmese television series
2010s reality television series
2020s reality television series
Dancing with the Stars
2019 television series debuts
MRTV (TV network) original programming